John Robert Thompson Jr. (September 2, 1941August 30, 2020) was an American college basketball coach for the Georgetown Hoyas men's team. He became the first African-American head coach to win a major collegiate championship in basketball when he led the Hoyas to the NCAA Division I national championship in 1984. Thompson was inducted into the Naismith Memorial Basketball Hall of Fame and National Collegiate Basketball Hall of Fame.

Thompson played college basketball for the Providence Friars and earned honorable mention All-American honors in 1964. He played for two seasons in the National Basketball Association (NBA) for the Boston Celtics, who won an NBA championship in both seasons. Thompson became a high school coach in Washington, D.C., before coaching Georgetown for 27 seasons. He worked as a radio and television sports commentator after his retirement from coaching. Thompson earned his Master’s Degree in Counseling and Guidance at the University of the District of Columbia (UDC). He also served as an employee at the Center for 4-H and Youth Development at UDC.

Early life
Thompson was born and raised in Washington, D.C., and was a practicing Roman Catholic.  As a child, his mother insisted on sending him to Catholic schools for the educational opportunities and academic challenges.  At Archbishop Carroll High School, Thompson emerged as a standout center, playing in three consecutive City Championship games (1958–60). In 1959, Carroll All-Mets Thompson, Monk Malloy, George Leftwich and Tom Hoover won over Cardozo 79–52. The next year, Thompson and Leftwich led the Lions over the Ollie Johnson/Dave Bing led Spingarn, 69–54.  During his senior year, Thompson led Carroll to a 24–0 record, preserving their 48-game winning streak along the way.  Carroll capped off the undefeated 1960 season with a 57–55 win over St Catherine's Angels of Racine, Wisconsin in the Knights of Columbus National Championship Tournament with Thompson scoring a team-high 15 points and adding 12 rebounds. He was voted  to the all-tournament team and was later named a second-team Parade All-American.

Playing career
After graduating from  Archbishop Carroll, Thompson went to Providence College, where he played on the 1963 NIT Championship team with Ray Flynn, and was part of the first Providence NCAA tournament team in his senior year in 1964, when he received honorable mention from the Associated Press for its All-American team. Upon graduation, Thompson was the Friars' all-time leader in points, scoring average, and field goal percentage, and second in rebounds to former teammate Jim Hadnot.

He was selected in the third round of the 1964 NBA draft and played two seasons in the National Basketball Association (NBA) for the Boston Celtics from 1964 to 1966. Nicknamed "The Caddy" for his secondary role to Russell, he averaged 3.5 points and 3.5 rebounds in 74 games played. Thompson was selected by the Chicago Bulls in the 1966 NBA expansion draft, but he decided to retire from playing instead of relocating to Chicago.

Coaching career

Georgetown
Thompson was a guidance counselor and head coach at St. Anthony High School in Washington, D.C. from 1966 to 1972, compiling a 122–28 record. He left St. Anthony for Georgetown University, who chose him over more experienced candidates Morgan Wootten and George Raveling.

Inheriting a Hoyas team which had been 3–23 the year before, Thompson led the Hoyas to a .500 record by his second season. By his third season in 1974–75, Georgetown qualified for the NCAA tournament for the first time since 1943. Over 27 years, Thompson's Hoyas went 596–239, running off a streak of 24 postseason appearances – 20 in the NCAA tournament and 4 in the NIT – including a 14-year streak of NCAA appearances from 1979 to 1992 that saw three Final Four appearances in 1982, 1984 and 1985. The 1984 squad, led by  center Patrick Ewing, won the Division I national championship over Houston, and Thompson became the first African-American coach to lead his team to the title. Two years earlier, Thompson had become the first Black coach to advance their team to the Final Four. Georgetown missed repeating as champs in 1985, losing in the finals to underdog Villanova.

Thompson, an imposing figure on the sidelines who towered over many opposing coaches (and players, for that matter), was often noted for the trademark white towel that he carried on his shoulder during the games, which he did as a tribute to his mother. He won seven Coach of the Year awards: Big East (1980, 1987, 1992), United States Basketball Writers Association (1982), The Sporting News (1984), National Association of Basketball Coaches (1985), and United Press International (1987). Thompson coached many notable players, including Ewing, Sleepy Floyd, Alonzo Mourning, Dikembe Mutombo, and Allen Iverson. Under Thompson, 26 players were chosen in the NBA draft; eight were drafted in the first round, including two players selected first overall: Ewing and Iverson. Thompson also insisted on top academic performance from his players and maintained a 97% graduation rate among the team.

Confronting drug lord
In the late 1980s, Thompson got word that several of his players, including Alonzo Mourning, were associating with noted Washington, D.C. drug lord (and avid Hoya fan) Rayful Edmond III, whose crew was connected to at least forty homicides. At the height of his empire, Edmond became very friendly with several Hoyas players. When Thompson confirmed what was happening, he sent word through his sources to have Edmond meet him at his office at McDonough Gymnasium.

When Edmond arrived, Thompson was initially cordial, and informed Edmond that he needed to cease all contacts with his players post haste, specifically John Turner and Mourning, both of whom had befriended Edmond.  When Edmond tried to assure him that his players were not involved in anything illegal, the 6'10" Thompson stood up and pointed his index finger between Edmond's eyes. Thompson, known for his volatility, quickly boiled over, and unleashed a profanity-laced tirade in which he told Edmond that he did not care about his crew's violent reputation or propensity to commit murder. Edmond had crossed a line with Thompson's players, and Thompson was not going to allow Edmond to destroy the players' lives.

At the publishing of his autobiography however, it was revealed that the conversation between Edmond and Thompson was not as confrontational as once believed. "A myth has grown about me threatening Rayful and ordering him to stay away from my players. Some people like to say I stood over him and pointed my finger in his face. That's nonsense. That myth is based on the perception of me as intimidating and a bully. Like when I argued with refs, I supposedly scared them.

By all accounts, Edmond never associated with another Hoyas player on a personal level. It was believed that Thompson was the only person to stand up to Edmond without consequence, initially causing some shock and surprise that there was no reprisal.

US national team
Thompson was an assistant coach for the US national team on its gold medal-winning 1976 Olympic team. He was later the head coach of the 1988 Olympic team, the Americans' last fully collegiate squad. Although favored to win the international tournament, the United States was narrowly defeated by the all-professional and experienced Soviet Union in the semifinals 82–76, marking the first time the Americans did not reach the gold medal game. The United States won its final game against Australia to capture the bronze medal.

Protest against Proposition 42
On January 14, 1989, before the start of Georgetown's home game against Boston College, Thompson walked off the Capital Centre floor and turned coaching duties over to assistant Mike Riley. Thompson was protesting the NCAA's Proposition 42, which would have denied athletic scholarships to student athletes who failed to qualify academically under standards of the already in effect Proposition 48. Thompson expressed concerns that the proposal would leave many student athletes without a means of paying for their education, as well as what he felt would be the proposal's disproportionate impact on Black athletes.

Resignation
On January 8, 1999, Thompson announced his resignation as Georgetown's head coach, citing marriage problems.  He was replaced by longtime assistant Craig Esherick. Thompson was inducted into the Naismith Memorial Basketball Hall of Fame on October 1, 1999.

Esherick was fired in 2004 and replaced by John Thompson III, Thompson's eldest son. At the time the elder Thompson was serving Georgetown in what Rev. Leo J. O'Donovan, university president, referred to as a "coach emeritus" position, assisting on academic, athletic, and community projects. John Thompson III coached Georgetown until 2017.

John Thompson Jr.'s younger son, Ronny Thompson, formerly an assistant coach at Georgetown, was the head coach at Ball State.

Life after coaching
After retiring from coaching, Thompson became the presidential consultant for urban affairs at Georgetown University, a basketball commentator for TNT and host of a sports talk show, The John Thompson Show, on WTEM in Washington, D.C. He signed a lifetime contract with Clear Channel Radio and WTEM in 2006. Working with Rick Walker, Thompson remained on the show until 2012.

Thompson was scheduled to be on American Airlines Flight 77 on  September 11, 2001, but his seat was cancelled.  Ten years later,  on The Jim Rome Show, Thompson would reunite with the ticket agent who removed him from Flight 77.

Georgetown University's John R. Thompson Intercollegiate Athletic Center was completed in 2016. The lobby includes a statue of Thompson.

Thompson's autobiography, I Came as a Shadow, was published posthumously in December 2020.

Death 
Thompson died at his home in Arlington, Virginia on August 30, 2020, three days before his 79th birthday.

Head coaching record

Source:

See also
 List of NCAA Division I men's basketball tournament Final Four appearances by coach

Notes

References

External links

1941 births
2020 deaths
20th-century African-American sportspeople
21st-century African-American people
African-American basketball coaches
African-American Catholics
American men's basketball players
American Olympic coaches
American Roman Catholics
American sports radio personalities
American television sports announcers
Archbishop Carroll High School (Washington, D.C.) alumni
Basketball coaches from Washington, D.C.
Basketball players from Washington, D.C.
Boston Celtics draft picks
Boston Celtics players
Centers (basketball)
Chicago Bulls expansion draft picks
College basketball announcers in the United States
College men's basketball head coaches in the United States
Georgetown Hoyas men's basketball coaches
Naismith Memorial Basketball Hall of Fame inductees
National Basketball Association broadcasters
National Collegiate Basketball Hall of Fame inductees
Nike, Inc. people
Parade High School All-Americans (boys' basketball)
Providence Friars men's basketball players
United States men's national basketball team coaches
University of the District of Columbia alumni